Michael Landon Jr. (born Michael Graham Landon on June 20, 1964) is an American actor, director, writer, and producer.

Life 
Landon Jr. is the son of actor Michael Landon and his second wife, Marjorie Lynn Noe. He is the brother of Christopher B. Landon, Leslie Landon, Shawna Landon, and the half-brother of Cheryl Lynn Landon (from his mother's first marriage) and Jennifer Landon (from his father's third marriage) and Sean Landon (from his father's third marriage). His paternal grandfather was Jewish, whereas his paternal grandmother was Catholic, although his father was raised Jewish.

He married actress Sharee Gregory in December 1987. They have three children: daughters Ashley and Brittany and son Austin. Sharee Gregory is the older sister of former child actress Natalie Gregory.

Landon converted to Christianity at the age of 18.

Filmography

Acting 
1977: Little House on the Prairie as Jim (episode: "The Election")
1988: Bonanza: The Next Generation (TV) as Benjamin 'Benj' Cartwright
1988: Superboy as Stretch (episode: "The Fixer")
1993: Back to Bonanza (TV) as Host
1993: Bonanza: The Return (TV) as Benjamin 'Benj' Cartwright
1995: Bonanza: Under Attack (TV) as Benjamin 'Benj' Cartwright

Directing 
1991: Michael Landon: Memories with Laughter and Love  (TV)
1999: Michael Landon, the Father I Knew  (TV)
2003: Love Comes Softly  (TV)
2004: Love's Enduring Promise  (TV)
2005: Love's Long Journey  (TV)
2006: Love's Abiding Joy (TV)
2007: Saving Sarah Cain (TV)
2007: The Last Sin Eater
2007: The Velveteen Rabbit
2008: Deep in the Heart
2011: The Shunning  (TV)
2013: The Ultimate Life
2013: When Calls the Heart  (TV)

Writing 
1993: Bonanza: The Return (TV) (story)
1999: Michael Landon, the Father I Knew (TV) (story)
2003: Love Comes Softly (TV) (teleplay)
2004: Love's Enduring Promise (TV) (teleplay)
2005: Love's Long Journey (TV) (teleplay)
2006: Love's Abiding Joy (teleplay) (television story)
2007: Love's Unfolding Dream (Teleplay)
2007: The Last Sin Eater  (screenplay)
2013: When Calls the Heart

Producing 
2003: Love Comes Softly (TV) (co-executive producer)
2004: Love's Enduring Promise (TV) (co-executive producer)
2007: Saving Sarah Cain (film) (producer)
2007: The Last Sin Eater (producer)
2008: Deep in the Heart
2013–present: When Calls the Heart (executive producer)
2019–present: When Hope Calls (executive producer)

References

External links 

Personal interview with Michael Landon Jr.

1964 births
Living people
American male television actors
American male screenwriters
American people of Jewish descent
American television directors
Television producers from California
American male child actors
People from Encino, Los Angeles
Screenwriters from California
Michael Landon family
Converts to Christianity from Judaism